Charles Palmer was Governor of the Bank of England from 1754 to 1756. He had been Deputy Governor from 1752 to 1754. He replaced Alexander Sheafe as Governor and was succeeded by Matthews Beachcroft.

See also
Chief Cashier of the Bank of England

References

External links

Governors of the Bank of England
Year of birth missing
Year of death missing
British bankers
Deputy Governors of the Bank of England